Mark McInnes, Baron McInnes of Kilwinning,  (born 4 November 1976) is a Scottish Conservative politician and member of the House of Lords.

He was educated at Kilwinning Academy and the University of Edinburgh (MA, 1998).

Political career

McInnes was the director of the Scottish Conservative Party and was a Councillor for the Meadows/Morningside ward of Edinburgh City Council.

McInnes was appointed a Commander of the Order of the British Empire (CBE) in the 2016 New Year Honours.

McInnes was included in the list of nominations for life peerages in the 2016 Prime Minister's Resignation Honours. He was created Baron McInnes of Kilwinning, of Kilwinning in the County of Ayrshire on the morning of 1 September.

At the time he said: “It is an enormous honour and overwhelming responsibility I was intending to stand down from council next year in any case and will now look forward to representing people somewhere else.

“I will do my very best to represent Scotland and Edinburgh to scrutinise legislation and bring what knowledge I have from a Scottish perspective and also with experience of working in local government to the House of Lords.”

References

1976 births
Living people
Alumni of the University of Edinburgh
Commanders of the Order of the British Empire
Conservative Party (UK) life peers
Life peers created by Elizabeth II
Councillors in Edinburgh
Scottish Conservative Party councillors
People educated at Kilwinning Academy